Franz Xaver Chwatal (19 June 1808 – 24 June 1879) was a Bohemian pianist, composer and music teacher.

Life
Chwatal was born in Rumburg, Bohemia (in the modern Czech Republic). He was the son of an organ builder, who gave him piano lessons as a child.  From 1822 to 1832 he worked as a music teacher in Merseburg, where he created his first compositions. From 1835, he worked as a music teacher in Magdeburg. In the 1850s, he travelled with Christian Friedrich Ehrlich to the Institute für Gemeinschaftlichen Clavierunterricht (Institute for Community Piano Lessons).

He composed numerous pieces of music.  However, these compositions have had a reputation as lighter, popular music. The German music critic Robert Schumann called them "Stübchenmusik" (parlour music).

Selected works
Historischer Notizkalender für Musiker und Musikfreunde (1861)
Methodisch geordnete Pianoforte-Schule
Praktische Elementar-Pianoforteschule
Alpenklänge. Miniatur-Bilder für das Pianoforte.
Nacht, o Nacht, du heilge Nacht,  choral song with Wilhelmine von Chezy

1808 births
1879 deaths
Austrian composers
Male composers
Austrian music educators
19th-century composers
People from Rumburk
19th-century male musicians
19th-century musicians
Austrian people of German Bohemian descent